Kyle Miller (born April 18, 1988) is a former American football tight end. He was originally signed by the Jacksonville Jaguars as an undrafted free agent in 2011. He played college football at Mount Union. Miller has also played for the Indianapolis Colts, Miami Dolphins, Atlanta Falcons, and San Diego Chargers. He is the son of former NFL quarterback Mark Miller.

Professional career

Jacksonville Jaguars
On July 26, 2011, Miller was signed as an undrafted free agent by the Jacksonville Jaguars. On September 3, 2011, he was waived by the Jaguars.

Indianapolis Colts
On April 3, 2012, Miller was signed by the Indianapolis Colts. On August 31, 2012, he was waived by the Colts. On September 1, 2012, he was signed to the Colts' practice squad. On November 12, 2012, Miller was promoted to the Colts' active roster. On November 19, 2012, he was waived by the Colts.

Miami Dolphins
On November 20, 2012, Miller was claimed off waivers by the Miami Dolphins. On August 31, 2013, he was cut by the Dolphins. On September 2, 2013, he was signed to the Dolphins' practice squad. On December 31, 2013, Miller signed a reserve/future contract with the Dolphins. On August 30, 2014, he was cut by the Dolphins.

Atlanta Falcons
On September 1, 2014, Miller was signed to the Atlanta Falcons' practice squad. On May 3, 2015, he was waived by the Falcons.

San Diego Chargers
On May 5, 2015, Miller was claimed off waivers by the San Diego Chargers. On September 15, 2015, he was waived by the Chargers. On September 24, 2015, Miller was re-signed by the Chargers. On September 29, 2015, he was waived again by the Chargers.

References

External links
Miami Dolphins bio
Indianapolis Colts bio
Mount Union Purple Raiders bio

1988 births
Living people
People from Bowling Green, Ohio
Players of American football from Ohio
American football tight ends
Mount Union Purple Raiders football players
Jacksonville Jaguars players
Indianapolis Colts players
Miami Dolphins players
Atlanta Falcons players
San Diego Chargers players